Robert McIntyre may refer to:

 Robert McIntyre (politician) (1913–1998), Scottish politician
 Robert McIntyre (Paralympian) (1950s–1995), Australian Paralympic athlete
 Robert McIntyre (bishop) (1851–1914), Scottish-born American clergyman
 Rob McIntyre (born 1956), Australian alpine skier
 Bob McIntyre (motorcyclist) (1928–1962), Scottish motorcycle racer
 Bob McIntyre (soccer) (1904–1998), Scottish-American soccer center forward
 Bob McIntyre (basketball) (born 1944), American basketball player

See also
 Robert Macintyre (1940–1997), Scottish architect
 Robert MacIntyre (born 1996), Scottish golfer